KYNZ (107.1 FM) is a radio station licensed to Lone Grove, Oklahoma, United States. The station is currently owned by Stephens Media Group, through licensee SMG-Ardmore, LLC.

References

External links

YNZ
Radio stations established in 1988
1988 establishments in Oklahoma